Bâbak Amir-Tahmasseb (born 19 May 1976) is an Iranian-born French sprint kayaker who competed in the early to mid-2000s. He won a gold medal in the K-1 1000 m event at the 2001 ICF Canoe Sprint World Championships in Poznań.

Amir-Tahmasseb also competed in two Summer Olympics, earning his best finish of fourth in the K-2 500 m event at Sydney in 2000.

He is a member of the Strasbourg Eaux-Vives club.

References

Official website

Strasbourg.fr profile

1976 births
Canoeists at the 2000 Summer Olympics
Canoeists at the 2004 Summer Olympics
French male canoeists
Iranian emigrants to France
Iranian male canoeists
Living people
Olympic canoeists of France
Sportspeople from Tehran
Olympic competitors from Iran who represented other countries
ICF Canoe Sprint World Championships medalists in kayak